Anchotrechus punctipennis is a species of beetle in the family Carabidae, the only species in the genus Anchotrechus.

References

Trechinae